Laurent Berger (born 27 October 1968 in Guérande, Loire-Atlantique) is a French trade unionist. He has been the general secretary of the French Democratic Confederation of Labour (CFDT) since 28 November 2012.

Life

Youth
Laurent Berger is the son of a worker of the Chantiers de l'Atlantique and of a child care assistant.

During his studies, he was a supervisor in a high school. He joined the French Democratic Confederation of Labour at that time. After he earned a master's degree in history from Nantes University, he became a permanent staff member of the Young Christian Workers (YCW) in 1991. He was the general secretary of the YCW from 1992 to 1994.

He was subsequently unemployed for six months and was intermittently a substitute teacher of history and geography.

He was employed by a social insertion association in Saint-Nazaire to help long-term unemployed adults and RMI beneficiaries to find jobs. There, he created a CFDT section and became the staff representative of this association of nine employees.

Union action
In 1996, Berger became a permanent staff member of the Saint-Nazaire CFDT local union. He worked on employment and youth issues within the trade union.

In 2003, he was elected general secretary of the CFDT regional union of Pays de la Loire and joined the CFDT national office.

On 17 June 2009 he was elected to the Confederal Executive Commission, the leading body of the CFDT, where he was in charge of small business files. After 2010, he was in charge of employment issues, securing career and integration paths. In this respect, he was the CFDT negotiator to state unemployment insurance and to youth employment.

Berger was appointed as the deputy general secretary of CFDT on 21 March 2012.

He was the head of a reflection on the functioning of the CFDT, aimed at bringing the union closer to employees.

After François Chérèque's resignation, Berger was elected as the general secretary by the CFDT national office on 28 November 2012. He was re-elected with 98.31 percent of votes on 5 March 2014 during a CFDT congress in Marseille.

In 2016, Berger supported the Socialist government's labour law reform bill, in contrast with the FO and CGT unions.

In June 2018, Berger was re-elected as the general secretary of the CFDT with more than 90 percent of votes. Under Berger's chairmanship, the CFDT became the largest trade union at union elections in the private sector (2017) but remained the second one at the elections in the Civil Service (2018). On 11 December 2018 Berger tweeted that the CFDT had become the first trade union in France, overtaking the General Confederation of Labour (CGT).

Berger has been the chairman of the European Trade Union Confederation since May 2019.

Opinion against the National Front
In an interview with Francis Brochet for regional press group EBRA in the aftermath of the 2014 European Parliament election favourable towards the National Front, Laurent Berger stated: "For me, the National Front is always too high: this party (I am not talking about its voters) is a stain on democracy. We have the choice between an authoritarian society that will be into the 'We just have to' and look for a scapegoat, and a more appeased society of dialogue and listening. It is more complicated, but it will always be my choice."

In April 2017, during the 2017 French presidential election, Berger announced he had "clearly taken a stance against Marine Le Pen and published arguments for [CFDT's] militants", even if he did not give any voting instructions.

Publications
 Laurent Berger, Claude Sérillon, Syndiquez-vous, Le Cherche midi, 2019 
 Laurent Berger, dialogue with Denis Lafay, Au boulot ! Manifeste pour le travail, Éditions de l'Aube, 2018 
 Laurent Berger, Pascal Canfin, interviews with Philippe Frémeaux, Réinventer le progrès, Les Petits Matins, 2016 
 Laurent Berger, Permis de construire, Tallandier, 2015

References

20th-century French people
21st-century French people
French Democratic Confederation of Labour members
French trade union leaders
People from Loire-Atlantique
University of Nantes alumni
1968 births
Living people